Chakin' is a compilation album by Shit and Shine, released on 10 February 2015 by Astral Spirits. The album comprises improvised jazz sessions recorded for Clouse's Tuesday Jazz Chat on YouTube. The music is comparable to Sun Ra and Bitches Brew-era Miles Davis.

Release and reception
The vinyl pressing was limited to four-hundred and seven copies, with five unique sleeve illustrations: Green background print, limited to one-hundred and forty-nine copies. Green/grey background print, limited to three copies. Green/yellow background print, limited to eight copies. Grey background print, limited to ninety-nine copies. Yellow background print, limited to one-hundred and forty-eight copies. It made seventh place on The Vinyl Factory's "The 10 Most Collectable Records of 2015" end of the year list, with the columnist saying, "the concept is charmingly shambolic, somewhat random and wonderfully egalitarian."

Track listing

Personnel
Adapted from the Chakin' liner notes.
Musicians
 Craig Clouse – Wurlitzer electric piano, electronics, acoustic bass guitar, drums
 Nate Cross – Dual Rhodes, electronics, percussion
 King Coffey – drums
 Ingebrigt Håker Flaten – acoustic bass guitar
 Pete Simonelli – vocals

Release history

References

External links 
 
 ''Chakin''' at Bandcamp

2015 compilation albums
Shit and Shine albums